Garden Grove Township is a township in Decatur County, Iowa, USA.  As of the 2000 census, its population was 428.

History
Garden Grove Township was created in 1850.

Geography
Garden Grove Township covers an area of 35.73 square miles (92.55 square kilometers); of this, 0.04 square miles (0.11 square kilometers) or 0.12 percent is water. The streams of Mormon Pool and Weldon Creek run through this township.

Cities and towns
 Le Roy
 Garden Grove

Adjacent townships
 Franklin Township, Clarke County (north)
 Union Township, Lucas County (northeast)
 Richman Township, Wayne County (east)
 High Point Township (south)
 Center Township (southwest)
 Franklin Township (west)
 Green Bay Township, Clarke County (northwest)

Cemeteries
The township contains five cemeteries: Doze, Garden Grove, Metier, Morman and Winters.

Major highways

References
 U.S. Board on Geographic Names (GNIS)
 United States Census Bureau cartographic boundary files

External links
 US-Counties.com
 City-Data.com

Townships in Decatur County, Iowa
Townships in Iowa